Judith Sargent Stevens Murray (May 1, 1751 – June 9, 1820) was an early American advocate for women's rights, an essay writer, playwright, poet, and letter writer. She was one of the first American proponents of the idea of the equality of the sexes—that women, like men, had the capability of intellectual accomplishment and should be able to achieve economic independence. Among many other influential pieces, her landmark essay "On the Equality of the Sexes" paved the way for new thoughts and ideas proposed by other feminist writers of the century.

Life and career

Early life and family
Judith Sargent was born on May 1, 1751 in Gloucester, Massachusetts, to Winthrop Sargent and Judith Saunders as the first of eight children. Her parents were Judith Saunders and Winthrop Sargent, and they were an established merchant family. The Sargent children were raised in the established Congregational First Parish Church. In the 1770s, Judith, her siblings, and her parents all converted to Universalism and helped to fund and create the first Universalist Church in the nation, installing John Murray as the first pastor. The Sargent family was considered to be cultured, politically aware, and civically active.

As a wealthy, ship-owning merchant family, Judith's parents were able to provide her and her siblings with a top-notch education. For a woman in that era, her education was unusually thorough. Judith swayed from traditional gender norms by sharing a tutor (minister John Rogers) with her brother, Winthrop Sargent, as he prepared for entry into Harvard College. However, despite John Rogers' tutoring, there were few opportunities for her to receive any formal education beyond reading and writing. Much of her knowledge was self-taught through her family's library. She read history, philosophy, geography, and literature. Her deep interest in education and her family's support led her to write poetry from as young as nine years old. According to family legend, her father read Judith's "humble attempts at poetry" to family members, to make it clear he was incredibly proud of her talents. Although she considered herself as capable as her brother, her educational experience was far inferior to his. Thus, even as a young girl, she was painfully aware of the way her society circumscribed the aspirations of women.

Primarily self-taught thanks to the family library in her merchant-class home, Murray believed that with quality education, women's accomplishments would equal those of men's. She believed women would succeed in life for two reasons: 1) education, 2) parents who raised their daughters to "reverence themselves," as she put it in one of her essays.

A student of history, Murray used examples of women's accomplishments dating to ancient times to prove her points and to provide leadership in what would become a long struggle for women to fulfill their potential and become fully empowered members of society.

Career accomplishments
Judith Sargent Murray began her early career covering a wide range of literary styles. Not only did Murray write over one hundred essays, including her landmark essay "On the Equality of the Sexes" in 1790, she also published a number of books, several poems, and two comic plays throughout the late 1700s and early 1800s. Murray also wrote anonymously under assumed names including "Constantia," "The Reaper," "Honora Martesia," and, most famously, as her male persona "Mr. Vigilius" or "The Gleaner." She adopted this masculine pen name because she wanted her readers to consider her ideas and not dismiss them as merely derived from the pen of a woman. Murray's three-volume 1798 book of essays and plays titled The Gleaner, established her as a leading author and intellect, and as an advocate for women's equality, education, and economic independence. Essays in The Gleaner also championed the new republic; considered citizenship, virtue, and philanthropy; decried war and violence of any kind; and discussed Universalism, Murray's chosen faith. The book was purchased by such prominent figures as George Washington, John Adams, Henry Knox, and Mercy Otis Warren.

At approximately age twenty-three, Judith Sargent Murray began making copies of her correspondence to create a historical record for future generations. These letter books—twenty volumes in all—were discovered in 1984 by Gordon Gibson and were published on microfilm by the Mississippi Department of Archives and History, where the original volumes reside. Containing approximately 2,500 letters, Murray's letter books make up one of the few surviving collections of writings by women from this period in American history. (The letter books are currently being transcribed and published by the Judith Sargent Murray Society. Learn more about the Letter Books Project at http://www.jsmsociety.com)

Her essays argued that education would enable women to support their families if the need arose or to achieve economic independence if they chose to remain single. Judith Sargent was a staunch believer in improved educational opportunity for women. Her essays were important to the post-Revolution "Republican Motherhood" movement, a movement led by Abigail Adams and other female revolutionaries which aimed to produce intelligent and virtuous citizens required for the success of the new nation. Their keystone argument was that the education of patriotic sons – who would be voters - rested largely in the hands of mothers, which resonated with great importance to the success of the world's first experiment in governance without a monarch or other permanent authority. Sargent was a feminist pioneer, and one of the first advocates to publicly claim female equality in the new Nation. Her original insight in her 1790 essay, "On the Equality of the Sexes" is repeated by feminists today,

Universalism
Judith Sargent Murray was among the group of people in Gloucester, led by her father, Winthrop Sargent, who first embraced Universalism. Universalist historians consider Judith Sargent Murray's involvement in Universalism among the reasons why women have always held leadership roles in the Universalist church, including as ministers. Her 1782 Universalist catechism, written for children, is considered the earliest writing by an American Universalist woman. Her name was included in the public documents that expelled the Gloucester Universalists from First Parish (Calvinist/Congregational) for refusing to attend and pay taxes to the established church. The Universalists took their case to the Massachusetts Supreme Judicial Court and won the first ruling in America for freedom of religion, meaning, the right to support their own church, their own minister, and not pay taxes to First Parish. This ruling affected religious groups throughout the nation.

The minister they wanted to support in their own Universalist church was John Murray, who is considered the founder of organized American Universalism. A native of England, John Murray first arrived in the colonies in 1770 and settled in Gloucester in 1774. Like Judith's father, people up and down the Eastern seaboard had already embraced the Universalist interpretation of the Bible put forth by the Welsh-born James Relly. John Murray, one of Relly's protégés, was the first preacher of the new faith in America. He was charismatic and convincing, and he succeeded in dismantling the dark, gloomy promises of Calvinism in favor of a more hopeful view of the present and life after. He organized fledgling groups into established Universalist churches and societies.

Marriages and family
On October 3, 1769, at eighteen years old, Judith married John Stevens, an important ship captain and trader at the time. They lived in the Sargent-Murray-Gilman-Hough House and had no children. When England and the American colonies went to war, Judith supported separation from the England, despite her friends and family members' economic and familial ties to Great Britain. She described the civil war as being fueled by "hostile terror" and attacking those whose "sentiments correspond not with the popular measures." She believed in a peaceful resolution by separation because she despised the violence and lawless power that reigned over the colonies. During the Revolution, or perhaps sometime afterward, the Sargent and Stevens families converted from Congregationalism to Universalism.

While Judith Sargent Stevens conformed to the norm of wife and mother, she reconceptualized the possibilities of women's contributions to American culture in the early poems that she began composing in 1775. In 1782, she began writing for publication. Only few of her poems were published in the Boston periodical, Gentlemen and Ladies Town and Country magazine, during 1784. Meanwhile, the American Revolution was raging, the Gloucester's shipping business suffered from the insecure seas. When the revolution finally ended in 1783, Stevens was deep in debt so Judith put her writing to work and began to publish to make an income. Her first essay was published in 1784 for Gentleman and Lady's Town and Country Magazine. "Desultory Thoughts upon the Utility of Encouraging a Degree of Self-Complacency, Especially in Female Bosoms." was her first piece in which she manifested her feminist ideals. In it she laid the groundwork for future essays on women and girls: "I would, from the early dawn of reason address [my daughter] as a rational being" and "by all means guard [my daughters] against a low estimation of self." Like most women of her time – and even men who wanted to hide their identity – she used a pseudonym, "Constantia."

Despite her publication efforts, the war had devastated John Stevens's merchant business. In 1786, he fled the United States to escape debtors' prison and went to the West Indies, where he died soon after. Two years later, in October 1788, she married Reverend John Murray. Judith still kept her maiden name Sargent and signed her letters "Judith Sargent Murray." In 1793, Judith and John moved from Gloucester to Boston, when they founded the city's first Universalist church. At the end of John Murray's life, Judith helped him publish his book Letters and Sketches of Sermons. She also edited, completed, and published his autobiography after his death.

John and Judith had two children together, one of whom survived infancy. Inspired by enlightenment thinkers like Mary Wollstonecraft, Judith Sargent Murray ensured that her daughter received a good education. She educated her daughter, Julia Maria (pronounced like Mariah), at home until she was old enough to attend an academy. John Murray encouraged Judith's literary ambitions, and where she became an active supporter of his efforts to establish Universalism in the new nation. Murray accompanied her husband on many of his preaching tours to New York, New Jersey, and Pennsylvania, allowing her to network and meet influential citizens such as Abigail Adams and Martha Custis Washington, who became supporters of her work as an author; Adams offered her moral and financial support, and allowed Murray's work to appear in The Gleaner. During her first marriage, Judith had adopted two of her first husband's orphaned nieces, Anna and Mary Plummer, and briefly housed another young orphan to whom she was related, Polly Odell. During her years with John Murray, Judith oversaw the education of twelve children, including her daughter, the children of her brothers, and those of family friends. When she traveled, she befriended more young people and maintained a regular correspondence with them. She helped found a female academy in Dorchester, Massachusetts, in 1802–3. Throughout her life, Murray was a dedicated teacher of young people with whom she came into contact.

Murray moved to Boston soon after the city had lifted its ban on theater performances in 1792, and she briefly diverted her skills to writing dramas and to defending the artistic and cultural benefits of theater. Due to the spread of Puritan beliefs, theater was generally considered to have corrupting effects on audiences. Murray supported the theater, but she also sought to transform it: "The stage is undoubtedly a very powerful engine," she wrote, "in forming the opinion and manners of a people. It is not then of importance to supply the American Stage with American Scenes?" Her plays were less well received than her nonfiction writing, and she continued to publish her ideas on women's equality in essays and periodicals.

Judith Sargent Murray died in Natchez, Mississippi on June 9, 1820 at the age of 69. She is buried in the Bingaman family cemetery, which was donated to the state-owned "Grand Village" archaeological park by Bingaman descendant Mrs. Grace MacNeil in 1978. Her daughter inscribed on her gravestone, "Dear spirit, the monumental stone can never speak thy worth." Julia Maria and her own daughter, Charlotte, died within a few years. Her son's family line ended within a generation, leaving no direct descendants of Judith Sargent and John Murray.

"On the Equality of the Sexes"

"On the Equality of the Sexes" is a 1790 essay by Judith Sargent Murray. Murray wrote the work in 1779 but did not release it until April 1790, when she published it in two parts in two separate issues of Massachusetts Magazine. The essay predated Mary Wollstonecraft's A Vindication of the Rights of Woman which was published in 1792 and 1794, and the work has been credited as being Murray's most important work.

Legacy
Judith Sargent Murray's legacy is a subject of much contemporary discussion. Because her letter books were only fairly recently discovered, no one has been able to produce a complete biography of her life, though "A Brief Biography with Documents" (by Sheila L. Skemp) is useful in understanding her life's contributions to the study of intellectual history. Alice Rossi's 1974 landmark book The Feminist Papers starts with Murray's "On the Equality of the Sexes." Rossi began the reinstatement of Murray's voice to the American story. Since the discovery of the letter books in 1984 at Arlington, in Natchez, Mississippi, by the Rev. Gordon Gibson, a Unitarian Universalist minister, and through the work of the Judith Sargent Murray Society, whose founder, Bonnie Hurd Smith, was recently recognized by Oxford University Press as the leading scholar on Murray. David McCullough included one of Murray's letters in his 2001 biography of John Adams, called John Adams. Cokie Roberts used Murray's letters in her book Founding Mothers.

Selected works

List of works taken from the Judith Sargent Murray Society

Books
Some Deductions from the System Promulgated in the Page of Divine Revelation: Ranged in the Order and Form of a Catechism Intended as an Assistant to the Christian Parent or Teacher published anonymously (1782)
The Gleaner: A Miscellaneous Production (1798)
 Life of the Rev. John Murray (1816—Judith Sargent Murray was the editor and author of the "continuation")

Essays
A Universalist Catechism (1782)
Desultory Thoughts upon the Utility of Encouraging a Degree of Self-Complacency, Especially in Female Bosoms (1784)
On the Equality of the Sexes (1790)
On the Domestic Education of Children (1790)
 The Gleaner (1792–94)
The Repository (1792–94)
The Reaper (1794)

Poems
A Rebus (1803)
An Hypothesis (1808)
Apology for an Epilogue (1790)
Birth-day Invitation (1803)
Honora Martesia (1809)
Lines Occasioned by the Death of an Infant (1790)
Lines Written while Rocking a Cradle (1802)
On Blending Spirit with Matter (1803)
Lines, Inscribed To An Amiable, And Affectionate Mother (1803)
Expiring Amity (1803)
Lines (1803)
The Consolation (1790)
Elegiack Lines (1790)
Invocation To Hope (1789)

Plays
The Medium, or, Happy Tea-Party; later renamed The Medium, or, Virtue Triumphant (1795)
The Traveller Returned (1796)
The African (1805)

References

External links

The Judith Sargent Murray Society -Biographical information on Judith Sargent Murray and John Murray, Project to publish Murray's Letter Books, Murray's essays and poems, Books on Murray, Images, Research assistance, founded by Bonnie Hurd Smith, leading expert on Murray
The Sargent House Museum -Home of Judith Sargent Murray, Gloucester, Massachusetts

Judith Sargent Murray at Dictionary of Unitarian and Universalist Biography
Judith Sargent Murray Society web site 
All Poetry: Poems by Judith Sargent Murray 
Michals, Debra. "Judith Sargent Murray". National Women's History Museum. 2015.

1751 births
1820 deaths
18th-century Christian universalists
18th-century American philosophers
18th-century American poets
18th-century essayists
18th-century American women writers
19th-century essayists
19th-century American philosophers
19th-century American writers
19th-century American women writers
American women philosophers
American women's rights activists
American women poets
American women essayists
American feminist writers
American essayists
American women dramatists and playwrights
Burials in Mississippi
Feminist philosophers
Members of the Universalist Church of America
Poets from Massachusetts
People from Gloucester, Massachusetts
People of colonial Massachusetts
Philosophers from Massachusetts